Weluree Ditsayabut, nickname Fai (born February 6, 1992 in  Tha Muang, Kanchanaburi) is a Thai beauty queen who held the Miss Universe Thailand 2014 and was about to represent her country at Miss Universe 2014 until her resignation on 9 June.

Early life
Weluree was born in Tha Muang, Kanchanaburi on February 6, 1992. She graduated from Visuttharangsi School in Kanchanaburi and she studied Faculty of Humanities, Kasetsart University.

Pageantry

Miss Universe Thailand 2014
Weluree was crowned Miss Universe Thailand 2014 represented Kanchanaburi on May 17, 2014 at Royal Paragon Hall, Siam Paragon in Bangkok, beating early bookie's favorite Pimbongkod Chankaew who finished 1st Runner-up in this event.

Resignation
Weluree was to represent Thailand in Miss Universe 2014, but resigned from her title on 9 June due to conflict with Thailand's prime minister.

Filmography

Television

References

External links
Official Miss Universe Thailand website
 
 

1992 births
Living people
Weluree Ditsayabut
Weluree Ditsayabut
Weluree Ditsayabut
Weluree Ditsayabut
Weluree Ditsayabut
Weluree Ditsayabut
Weluree Ditsayabut